Valentyna Melnyk (born 1978) is a New Zealand marketing academic. She is currently a full professor at Massey University.

Academic career

After a 2005 PhD titled  'Creating effective loyalty programs knowing what (wo-)men want'  from Tilburg University, Melnyk moved to Massey University, rising to full professor.

Melnyk's work focuses on loyalty programs, but she appears frequently in the press.

Selected works 
 Melnyk, Valentyna, Stijn MJ Van Osselaer, and Tammo HA Bijmolt. "Are women more loyal customers than men? Gender differences in loyalty to firms and individual service providers." Journal of Marketing 73, no. 4 (2009): 82–96.
 Melnyk, Valentyna, Kristina Klein, and Franziska Völckner. "The double-edged sword of foreign brand names for companies from emerging countries." Journal of Marketing 76, no. 6 (2012): 21–37.
 Melnyk, Valentyna, and Stijn MJ van Osselaer. "Make me special: Gender differences in consumers’ responses to loyalty programs." Marketing Letters 23, no. 3 (2012): 545-559.
 Melnyk, Valentyna, and Tammo Bijmolt. "The effects of introducing and terminating loyalty programs." European Journal of Marketing 49, no. 3/4 (2015): 398–419.
 Klein, Kristina, and Valentyna Melnyk. "Speaking to the mind or the heart: effects of matching hedonic versus utilitarian arguments and products." Marketing Letters 27, no. 1 (2016): 131–142.

References

External links
  
 
 

Living people
New Zealand women academics
Tilburg University alumni
Academic staff of the Massey University
1978 births